is a former Japanese football player. He played for Japan national team.

Club career
He first played for Yokohama Flügels youth team but became a Yokohama F. Marinos youth player when both teams merged in 1999. He was promoted to the top team in 2001. His first league appearance came on June 16, 2001 in a 0-2 defeat by FC Tokyo at the International Stadium Yokohama. His first league goal came on August 18, 2001 when he scored the lone goal against Kashiwa Reysol at Kashiwanoha Stadium. He became a regular player from 2003. The club won the champions 2003 and 2004 J1 League.

Sakata joined Superleague Greece side Aris Thessaloniki in 2011 after ten years at Yokohama F. Marinos but only stayed for a short time before returning to FC Tokyo for the 2nd half of the season.

In January 2012 it was announced he had signed for Avispa Fukuoka in J2 League. Avispa won the 3rd place in 2015 J2 League and was promoted to J1 League. However Avispa finished at the bottom place in 2016 J1 League and was relegated to J2 in a year. He opted to retire end of 2017 season.

National team career
He was a member of the Japan U-20 national team for the 2002 AFC Youth Championship in Qatar. The team finished runners-up and was qualified for the 2003 World Youth Championship.

At the World Youth Championship hosted by United Arab Emirates, he scored 4 goals in the tournament including against South Korea at knockout stage and became one of the top scorers along with Fernando Cavenaghi (Argentine), Dudu (Brazil) and Eddie Johnson (United States). The team exited at the quarter final stage after beaten by Brazil.

He made his full international debut for Japan on August 9, 2006 in a friendly against Trinidad and Tobago at the Tokyo National Stadium when he replaced Alessandro Santos in the 86th minute.

Personal life
Sakata married actress and TV Tarento Sayaka Fukuoka in February 2009．

Club statistics

National team statistics

Honors and awards

Team honors
  Yokohama F. Marinos
J1 League: 2003, 2004
J.League Cup: 2001
Japanese Super Cup: 2004, 2005

Personal awards
2003 FIFA World Youth Championship: Silver Shoe
J1 League Fair Play Player Award: 2007

References

External links

Japan National Football Team Database

Profile at Avispa Fukuoka
Profile at Yokohama F. Marinos 

1983 births
Living people
Association football people from Kanagawa Prefecture
Japanese footballers
Japan youth international footballers
Japan international footballers
J1 League players
J2 League players
Yokohama F. Marinos players
FC Tokyo players
Avispa Fukuoka players
Super League Greece players
Aris Thessaloniki F.C. players
Japanese expatriate footballers
Expatriate footballers in Greece
Japanese expatriate sportspeople in Greece
Association football forwards